Eddy, Eddie or Eduardo Rodríguez may refer to:

Entertainment industry figures
Eddie Rodriguez (1932–2001), Filipino actor and director
Eduardo Rodríguez (born 1945), Spanish guitarist and singer, co-founder of Triana (band)
Eduardo Rodríguez (director), Venezuelan film director and producer since 2002

Public officials
Eduardo Delgado Rodríguez (before 1950–2017), Cuban general and director of espionage
Eduardo Rodríguez Veltzé (born 1956), Bolivian president in 2005
Eddie Rodriguez (politician) (born 1971), American legislator in Texas

Sportsmen

Association football (soccer)
Eduardo Rodríguez (Spanish footballer) (born 1966), Spanish footballer
Eddie Rodriguez (soccer) (born 1970), Mexican-born American midfielder and coach
Luis Eduardo Rodríguez (born 1991), Mexican footballer
Eduardo Rodríguez (Argentine footballer), Argentine footballer

Baseball
Eduardo Rodríguez (right-handed pitcher) (1952–2009), Puerto Rican baseball player
Eddie Rodríguez (born 1959), Cuban-born American baseball player and coach
Eddy Rodríguez (pitcher) (born 1981), Dominican baseball player
Eddy Rodríguez (catcher) (born 1985), Cuban baseball player
Eduardo Rodríguez (left-handed pitcher) (born 1993), Venezuelan baseball player

Other sports
Eduardo Rodríguez (volleyball) (born 1971), Argentine volleyball player
Eduardo Iván Rodríguez (born 1978), Spanish hurdler

See also
Edwin Rodríguez (disambiguation)